The 53rd edition of the Femina Miss India beauty pageant was held on 9 April 2016 in Mumbai. Twenty-one contestants competed for the titles of Femina Miss India 2016. Aditi Arya crowned Priyadarshini Chatterjee as her successor. She represented India at Miss World 2016, Sushruthi Krishna was crowned as the 1st Runner Up by Aafreen Vaz, and Pankhuri Gidwani was crowned as the 2nd Runner Up by Vartika Singh.

Priyadarshini Chatterjee who won Femina Miss India World 2016 represented India at Miss World 2016 held in USA and placed in the top 20. Pankhuri Gidwani who won Femina Miss India 2nd Runner Up 2016 was designated Miss Grand India 2016 and represented India at Miss Grand International 2016 held in USA. 

After the Femina Miss India 2016 pageant, Lopamudra Raut who was not a contestant at Femina Miss India 2016, but had been a contestant in the 2013 and 2014 editions, was later designated by Femina as India's representative at Miss United Continents 2016 held in Ecuador where she placed as 2nd Runner Up.

Final results
Color keys

*: Although Lopamudra Raut was not a contestant in Femina Miss India 2016, she was later appointed by Femina as the representative of India in Miss United Continents 2016.

Contestants

Judging panel
 Amy Jackson
 Kabir Khan
 Yami Gautam
 Arjun Kapoor
 Ekta Kapoor
 Sanjay Dutt
 Sania Mirza
 Manish Malhotra
 Mireia Lalaguna - Miss World 2015 from Spain
 Shane Peacock

Presenters
 Manish Paul - Host
 Karan Johar - Host
 Shahrukh Khan - Final Results
 Shahid Kapoor
 Varun Dhawan - Introducing Top 5

City pageant winners
 Winners of the City Pageants will get a direct entry to fbb Femina Miss India 2016.

Femina Miss India Bangalore
 Femina Miss India Bangalore 2016 winners

Femina Miss India Kolkata
 Femina Miss India Kolkata 2016 winners

Femina Miss India Delhi
 Femina Miss India Delhi 2016 winners

References

External links
 Femina Miss India 2016 Finalists

2016
2016 in India
2016 beauty pageants